Nancy Oliver (born February 8, 1955) is an American playwright and screenwriter who is best known for her work on the successful TV series Six Feet Under. Oliver was nominated for the Academy Award for Best Original Screenplay in 2008 for her debut screenplay, Lars and the Real Girl.

Early life and career
Oliver was born in Syracuse, NY and raised in Framingham, Massachusetts. She began writing at an early age and earned a Bachelor of Arts in English from the University of Massachusetts Amherst, Amherst.  During this time she was involved with the university's theater department as  a performer.

While attending Florida State University in Tallahassee, Florida for theatre, Oliver met director and screenwriter Alan Ball in 1976.  Together they founded the General Nonsense Theater Company, a satirical ensemble for which the two wrote, staged and starred in subversive comical sketches.  She was also a member of Alarm Dog Rep.  A playwright whose work includes Office, Dreams Are Funny, Calypso" and "VW as well as several plays for young people, she twice won Florida's Individual Artist Grant for Playwriting.  In addition to working previously as a teacher, columnist and newspaper editor, she studied Drama at the Banff Fine Arts Center in Canada and Trinity College, Oxford. She earned a Master of Arts degree in Acting and Directing from Florida State University.

Career
After graduating, Oliver supported herself by doing "anything anyone would pay me to do that was kind of mindless—typing, filing, Xeroxing—so I could save the rest for writing and directing."  She moved to Los Angeles in 1997 after the computer game she was writing for, Riana Rouge, relocated to the West Coast.  She later teamed up again with Alan Ball, becoming his script reader.    A few years later, shortly after deciding to abandon show business and move back to Florida, Ball offered her a spot as a writer and co-producer for the award-winning television series Six Feet Under. Oliver began as a writer during the show's third season and stayed on for three years.

The idea for her first screenplay, which would eventually be made into the 2007 film Lars and the Real Girl, was the result of an early job in which she dealt "with a lot of Web sites and a lot of lonely guys."  Oliver considers the story, in which a lonely and delusional 27-year-old man forms a romantic attachment to a sex doll, a "contemporary fairy tale".  After contemplating the concept for nearly five years, Oliver wrote the script over a nine-month period in 2002, before she was hired at Six Feet Under.  In 2002, when her agent asked for a project to shop around, Oliver gave them Lars.  In 2005, it was ranked No. 3 on the 2005 edition of The Black List, a compilation of the Top 90 most-liked, un-produced scripts in Hollywood.

Directed by Craig Gillespie and starring Ryan Gosling, the film had its world premiere at the Toronto International Film Festival where it received a standing ovation from the audience.  The screenplay was eventually nominated for several awards, including an Academy Award for Original Screenplay. In 2008, Oliver received the Humanitas Prize for the screenplay.

In 2007, Oliver again teamed up with Alan Ball to write and direct episodes for his HBO vampire series, True Blood.  She is also in the early stages of another film project.

Awards and nominations
2009 Writers Guild of America (WGA) Award
Episodic drama "I Will Rise Up" True Blood (Nominated)
2008 Humanitas Prize
Feature Film: Lars and the Real Girl
2008 Academy Awards
Best Original Screenplay: Lars and the Real Girl (Nominated)
2008 Broadcast Film Critics Association Awards
Best Writer: Lars (Nominated)
National Board of Review Awards
Best Screenplay – Original: Lars (WON [Tied with Diablo Cody for Juno])
2008 WGA Award
Best Original Screenplay: Lars (Nominated)
2007 Satellite Awards
Best Screenplay, Original: Lars (Nominated)
2006 Writers Guild of America Awards
Best Dramatic Series: Six Feet Under (Nominated with ensemble)

References

External links
 
 New York Times profile

1955 births
20th-century American dramatists and playwrights
Screenwriters from New York (state)
American television writers
Florida State University alumni
Living people
People from Framingham, Massachusetts
University of Massachusetts Amherst alumni
American women dramatists and playwrights
American women screenwriters
American women television writers
Writers from Syracuse, New York
Alumni of Trinity College, Oxford
20th-century American women writers
Screenwriters from Massachusetts
21st-century American women